Chuniellidae is a family of worms belonging to the order Polystilifera.

Genera:
 Chunianna Coe, 1954
 Chuniella Brinkmann, 1917

References

Polystilifera
Nemertea families